Gorgora (Amharic: ጎርጎራ Gōrgōrā, also, especially formerly, ጐርጐራ Gʷargʷarā, modern pronunciation Gʷergʷerā) is a town and peninsula in northwestern Ethiopia. It is located south of Gondar on the north shore of Lake Tana, in the Semien Gondar Zone of the Amhara Region.

Geography 
Gorgora is a peninsula on the north shore of lake Tana. It has some 12 kilometers of width in its southern parts and stands on strategic location, an elevated rocky promontory overlooking the lake and next to a series of islands suitable for habitation.

Overview 
Gorgora refers to a small peninsula jutting into Lake Tana as well as to a small village hosting a harbor. The peninsula was important in the past as the site of an important Jesuit residence: "Old" Gorgora was located 5  km northeast, inland from Maryam Gimb, which was called [New] Gorgora, and 5  km west of Debre Sina and its churches (usually not considered a town in its own right). Other notable landmarks include the monastery of Mandaba, located at the headlands of Gorgora peninsula. R.E. Cheesman visited Mandaba in 1932 and described the monastery as being enclosed by a high wall and no woman is allowed inside its gate. There are 150 residents, monks,  the monastery is governed by an Abbot who has the power of putting refractory monks in chains, and is all powerful in his own monastery. Cheesman was told that if a man fleeing from justice rings the monastery bell and is given sanctuary, he is safe from even the highest person in the land.

Ferries sail from the port to Bahir Dar via Kunzela and Dek Island.

History 
Gorgora served as one of the early capitals of Ethiopia during the reigns of Emperor Susenyos I and his son Fasilides before Fasilides founded Gondar. It was selected as a capital as it started with the letter "gʷa" (Ge'ez: ጐ), as dictated by a prophecy of the time (the same prophecy led to the rise of Gondar). Gorgora is the Ethiopic bastardization of the Greek name "Γρηγόριος" (Gregorios). The city is named after the 4th-century Saint & Church Father Gregory the Illuminator, who is a prominent figure in Ethiopian Orthodox Theology.

Ruins of the structures the Jesuits built can still be seen, although most of the buildings fell following an earthquake in the 1950s. Their construction is credited to the missionary Pedro Paez, who also succeeded in converting Emperor Susenyos to Catholicism. The town is known for the Debre Sina church (built in 1608), its many monasteries, the palace of the Emperor Susenyos located nearby, and the Portuguese cathedral that was abandoned after Emperor Fasilides expelled the Jesuits.

Gorgora formed part of the defenses of the Italian last stand, under General Guglielmo Nasi, around Gondar. In October 1941, the Italians had one battalion at Gorgora; within a month the garrison was 1500 strong. In 1960 the public health service set up a center in this town, one of the first four in the countryside of Ethiopia. Gorgora was selected due to its proximity to the Public Health College in Gondar.

The water hyacinth plant was rapidly invading Lake Tana around Gorgora in 2018.

Demographics 
Based on figures from the Central Statistical Agency in 2005, Gorgora has an estimated total population of 4783, of whom 2283 are men and 2500 are women. The 1994 census reported this town had a total population of 2,768 of whom 1,201 were men and 1,567 were women.

Notes

External links

The View From Gondar: Part III, Gorgora by John Graham (Addis Tribune)

Populated places in the Amhara Region
Populated places on Lake Tana
Portuguese colonial architecture in Ethiopia
North Gondar Zone